The Cuban giant owl or giant cursorial owl (Ornimegalonyx) is an extinct genus of giant owl that measured  in height. It is closely related to the many species of living owls of the genus Strix. It was a flightless or nearly flightless bird and it is believed to be the largest owl that ever existed. It lived on the island of Cuba.

The first fossil specimen was mistakenly described as a bird in the family Phorusrhacidae, in part because the bones were so large. In 1961, Pierce Brodkorb reviewed the findings and placed them properly, with the owls. Remains have been abundant throughout the island, in cave deposits from the Late Pleistocene period (126,000 to 11,700 years ago) and at least three nearly complete skeletons have been found.

Taxonomy
In the past, three additional species of Ornimegalonyx besides O. oteroi were regarded as valid. All were described in 1982 and include:

Ornimegalonyx minor Arredondo, 1982
Ornimegalonyx gigas Arredondo, 1982
Ornimegalonyx acevedoi Arredondo, 1982

A 2020 study concluded that those species are all synonyms of O. oteroi, and describe a new valid species, Ornimegalonyx ewingi, from material formerly assigned to the prehistoric horned owl Bubo osvaldoi.

"Ornimegalonyx arredondoi" is a nomen nudum; the name was proposed for this species before it was described but oteroi was eventually adopted by Oscar Arredondo (according to the rules of the ICZN, naming a species after oneself is not prohibited, but it is frowned upon as vain by the scientific community).

Description

It had very long legs for its size, but was bulky overall and probably short-tailed. The modern owl that most resembles the Cuban giant owl in proportions is probably the dainty and quite small burrowing owl, the only surviving owl closely tied to the ground. This implies similar adaptations to the terrestrial lifestyle, but not a close phylogenetic relationship.

The legs and feet of the Cuban giant owl appear to be very large and powerfully built. This supports the theory that they were strong runners, hence the alternate name, cursorial. The keel of the sternum was reduced and the owl may have been capable of short burst of flight. It is probable that, like a modern wild turkey, the owl only took flight when extremely pressed, more often choosing to run. The females of this owl species were larger than the males.

Diet
The Cuban giant owl is believed to have preyed principally on large hutias, including Capromys, Geocapromys, and Macrocapromys (the latter being the size of a modern nutria or capybara) and the ground sloths Cubanocnus, Miocnus, Mesocnus, and Megalocnus, some of these sloths being roughly the size of a black bear. It was probably an ambush predator that would pounce on unsuspecting prey with its crushing talons.

See also

Tyto pollens
Tyto gigantea
Tyto robusta
Grallistrix
Chickcharney
Late Quaternary prehistoric birds
List of extinct birds
List of fossil birds
List of extinct animals
Flightless birds

References

Strigidae
Prehistoric bird genera
Extinct flightless birds
Pleistocene birds of North America
Extinct birds of the Caribbean
Extinct animals of Cuba
Late Quaternary prehistoric birds
Fossils of Cuba
Fossil taxa described in 1954
Apex predators